David Cabarcos González (born 7 February 1977) is a Spanish retired footballer who played as a striker.

Football career
Born in Oviedo, Asturias, Cabarcos moved in the 1999 summer to SD Compostela in the second division, from Galician neighbours Pontevedra CF. During his spell with the former club, he was almost exclusively used as a backup to the likes of Vladimir Gudelj and Christopher Ohen, as his team suffered two relegations from that level during his spell.

Cabarcos then spent four years in division three, playing two seasons apiece for CD Ourense and UDA Gramenet. In 2007, aged 30, he moved abroad for the first time, joining Alki Larnaca FC, freshly promoted to the Cypriot First Division, but returned to his country after only a few months and signed with another side in the third tier, CF Badalona.

Cabarcos retired from football in March 2009, because of persistent problems in his tibia. He was by far the Valencian Community team's top scorer in only 22 matches, but they suffered relegation from the third level.

References

External links

1977 births
Living people
Footballers from Oviedo
Spanish footballers
Association football forwards
Segunda División players
Segunda División B players
CD Lugo players
SD Compostela footballers
Pontevedra CF footballers
CD Ourense footballers
UDA Gramenet footballers
CF Badalona players
UD Alzira footballers
Cypriot First Division players
Alki Larnaca FC players
Spanish expatriate footballers
Expatriate footballers in Cyprus